Zarjan (also Romanized as Zarjān; also known as Zarjūn and Zarqūn) is a village in Khafr Rural District, Khafr District, Jahrom County, Fars Province, Iran. At the 2006 census, its population was 1,224, in 273 families.

References 

Populated places in  Jahrom County